Fiji has three official languages under the 1997 constitution (and not revoked by the 2013 Constitution): English, Fijian and Fiji Hindi. The Fijian language is spoken as the first language by most indigenous Fijians who make up around 54% of the population. 

Indo-Fijians make up a further 37%, mainly speaking a local variant of Hindi, known as Fiji Hindi. English, a remnant of British colonial rule over the islands, was the sole official language until 1997 and is widely used in government, business and education as a lingua franca. Considerable business is also done in Fijian, especially away from larger town centers.

A small number of other Indigenous West Fijian and East Fijian regional languages are spoken on the islands, standard Fijian belonging to the East Fijian group. Arabic and Urdu are spoken by Muslims. Chinese and Rotuman are also spoken by immigrant populations.

History
Until the 19th century, Fiji's population consisted almost entirely of indigenous Fijians, who were of mixed Polynesian and Melanesian descent and generally spoke languages of the Malayo-Polynesian language family. After the islands came under British colonial rule, a number of contract workers were brought from present-day British India, spreading the use of the Hindi language. 

All three of Fiji's official languages have greatly been influenced by one another, in terms of vocabulary and, in some cases, grammar because of the constant, everyday contact between these languages, now for over a century. Fiji's diverse, multiracial and multilingual makeup make these languages, as well as other unofficial, minority languages in Fiji (such as Chinese varieties, Arabic, Western Fijian, Gilbertese, Rotuman, Tuvaluan, and other present Indian languages), influence one another.

In 2022, Prime Minister Sitiveni Rabuka approved the use of vernacular languages in Parliament.

English
English usage in Fiji predates the cession of Fiji to Great Britain by a few decades. English was first encountered from the first explorers and traders and found greater popularity as a lingua franca (albeit mixed with English in an early and now extinct Pidgin Fijian) between frontier settlers and the indigenous people. By the time of the British administration, much of the Fijian nobility were able to comprehend basic English. The English spoken in Fiji today is very different and has developed significantly over the close to 150 years of usage in the islands.

Like many former colonies of Great Britain, there are certain 'situational varieties' of English present. There is the very formal, 'Proper' English (which would resemble formal English in Australia or the United Kingdom) as it is known, which is to be used in government and any other situation deemed formal enough for its use, but it has fallen out of favor due to the popularity of the more laid back varieties and is still spoken only by the older generation that lived through the colonial days. A sort of mid-level English is used in school, church, work and in semi-formal situations and is basically English with localized grammatical innovations and words imported from Hindi and Fijian; it is quickly becoming 'formal English' in Fiji. 

Very informal Fiji English, or Finglish, is used among all races with family, friends and in general conversations and in any other situation not deemed formal. Fiji English has been tentatively studied by linguists and has been suggested as a separate dialect from Standard English (as has developed in Australia and New Zealand) but the distinction is not made locally or in the constitution. Moreover, other linguists suggest it is part of a greater South Pacific English dialect because of the shared development of English within former British colonies and protectorates in the South Pacific.

Fijians, like most Pacific Islanders, have a distinct accent when speaking English.

Fijian

Fijian is an Austronesian language of the Malayo-Polynesian family spoken in Fiji. It has 300,000 first-language speakers, which is almost one-third of the population of Fiji, but another 300,000 speak it as a second language. The early missionaries selected the Bau dialect or Bauan (which, among the East Fijian dialects, held the place that French would in Europe, while the purer Rewa dialect would be Latin) as the standard dialect for printing and communicating. Bauan soon became the standard of communication among the indigenous Fijians. Bauan was selected not only because of its prestige but also because it was the language of the then politically dominant island of Bau and the Mataiwelagi chiefs (and claimed King of Fiji). 

By the middle to the late 19th century, with the push by missionaries, Bauan had also invaded the Western areas of Viti Levu, which spoke an entirely different set of dialects belonging to the West Fijian language, which is grouped with Polynesian and Rotuman in the West Fijian-Polynesian language family and practiced a different culture. This occurred up to the point that many Bauan words entered many western Fijian languages. Bauan was then adopted by the British administration for communication with the iTaukei. Over time, it evolved into what is today Standard Fijian which includes many English and Other Fijian Dialectal contributions, becoming quite distinct from the original Bauan Dialect.

Hindi

Hindi is an official language in Fiji. In the 1997 Constitution, it was referred to as "Hindustani", but in the 2013 Constitution of Fiji, it is simply called "Hindi".

Fiji Hindi, also known as Fijian Baat or Fijian Hindustani, is the language spoken by most Fijian citizens of Indian descent. It is derived mainly from the Awadhi and Bhojpuri varieties of Hindi. It has also borrowed a large number of words from Fijian and English. The relation between Fiji Hindi and Standard Hindi is similar to the relation between Afrikaans and Dutch. Indian indentured labourers were initially brought to Fiji mainly from districts of eastern Uttar Pradesh, Bihar, North-West Frontier and South India such as from Andhra and Tamil Nadu. They spoke numerous, mainly Hindi, dialects and languages depending on their district of origin.

A language soon developed in Fiji that combined the common elements of the Hindi dialects spoken in these areas with Fijian, Arabic, and English words; this has diverged significantly from the varieties of Hindi spoken on the Indian sub-continent. The development of Fiji Hindi was accelerated by the need for labourers speaking different dialects and sub-dialects of Hindi to work together and the practice of young children being left during working hours in early versions of day care centers. 

Later, approximately 15,000 Indian indentured labourers, who were mainly speakers of Dravidian languages (Telugu, Tamil and Malayalam), were brought from South India. By this time Fiji Hindi was well established as the lingua franca of Fiji Indians and the South Indian labourers had to learn it to communicate with the more numerous North Indians and European overseers. Inward migration of free Gujarati and Punjabi settlers further contributed to Fiji Hindi.

Arabic/Urdu
Arabic and Fiji Urdu is used by the Muslim Community in Fiji. The Muslims of Fiji comprise approximately 6% of the population (52,505). The Muslim community is made up of people of mostly Arab, Indian, Iranian, Baloch, Afghani and Pakistani origin, mostly descendants of indentured labourers who were brought to the islands in the late 19th century by the British colonialist rulers of the time.

Others
Fiji is also home to many smaller minorities which make up its multicultural and multilingual populace.

Rotuman, also referred to as Rotunan, Rutuman or Fäeag Rotuma, is an Austronesian language spoken by the indigenous people of the South Pacific island group of Rotuma, an island with a Polynesian-influenced culture that was incorporated as a dependency into the Colony of Fiji in 1881 and later chose to remain with Fiji in 1970 upon independence and in 1987, when Fiji became a republic. The rotuman language is spoken by more than 2000 people on the island of Rotuma and a further 10,000 people who live or work in the Republic of Fiji.

Other Indian languages are spoken in Fiji. After the indenture system, Indians who spoke Gujarati and Punjabi arrived in Fiji as free immigrants. At present, many free settler descendants in Fiji and their families speak Tamil, Telugu, Punjabi and Gujarati at home, but all speak and communicate with each other in English. 

Two significant languages that are seeing growth are Cantonese Chinese and Mandarin Chinese. Many Chinese settlers, especially from southern China speak Cantonese, which is quickly incorporating many Fijian and English words. Many of these migrants are farmers and are constantly exposed to the Fijian and Hindi dominated areas of rural Fiji.

Furthermore, sizeable minorities of Micronesians and Polynesians mean that Fiji is also home to various Micronesian and Polynesian languages. Significant among them is Gilbertese, which is the language of the former residents of Ocean Island or Banaba in Kiribati, which was decimated through British phosphate mining. They were given Rabi Island in North-Eastern Fiji as a new homeland and number 2000–3000. There is also Kioa, which was given to former Tuvaluans, who migrated as a consequence of overcrowding on Vaitupu. They speak Tuvaluan, a Polynesian language, and number around a thousand. Also, there are many Tongan residents and Fijians of Tongan descent in Fiji. These groups speak the Tongan language or a mix of Tongan and Fijian.

See also
 National language debate in Fiji

References